800 Fifth Avenue is a  skyscraper in Seattle, in the U.S. state of Washington. It was constructed from 1979 to 1981 and has 42 floors. It is the tenth-tallest building in Seattle and was designed by 3D/International. The building has been able to retain a minimum of 98% occupancy since it was opened.

The building was previously known as Bank of America Fifth Avenue Plaza when its naming rights were held by the Bank of America. It was originally built for Seafirst Bank, which was acquired by the Bank of America prior to the tower's completion. In April 2014, its name was changed to 800 Fifth Avenue. The building was acquired by EQ Office in 2019. It underwent an interior renovation in 2022 that was designed by Olson Kundig to create more lobby space and a public garden.

Major tenants
 Allstate
 Bank of America
 BDO
 Electronic Arts
 Office of the Attorney General of Washington
 Parametric Portfolio Associates
 Providence Health & Services
 Sonos

See also
List of tallest buildings in Seattle

References

External links
 800 Fifth Avenue at Hines Interests Limited Partnership

Bank of America buildings
Office buildings completed in 1981
Office buildings in Seattle
Skyscraper office buildings in Seattle
Bank buildings in Washington (state)
Hines Interests Limited Partnership
Leadership in Energy and Environmental Design gold certified buildings